Commonplace books (or commonplaces) are a way to compile knowledge, usually by writing information into books. They have been kept from antiquity, and were kept particularly during the Renaissance and in the nineteenth century. Such books are similar to scrapbooks filled with items of many kinds: sententiae (often with the compiler's responses), notes, proverbs, adages, aphorisms, maxims, quotes, letters, poems, tables of weights and measures, prayers, legal formulas, and recipes. Entries are most often organized under subject headings and differ functionally from journals or diaries, which are chronological and introspective." Commonplaces are used by readers, writers, students, and scholars as an aid for remembering useful concepts or facts; sometimes they were required of young women as evidence of their mastery of social roles and as demonstrations of the correctness of their upbringing. They became significant in Early Modern Europe.

"Commonplace" is a translation of the Latin term locus communis (from Greek tópos koinós, see literary topos) which means "a general or common topic", such as a statement of proverbial wisdom. In this original sense, commonplace books were collections of such sayings, such as John Milton's example. 'Commonplace book' is at times used with an expansive sense, referring to collections by an individual in one volume which have a common theme (e.g. ethics) or explores several themes. The term overlaps with aspects of the terms 'anthology' or 'mixed-manuscript' in these productions but most properly refers to a collection of sayings or excerpts by an individual, often collected under thematic headings. As a genre, commonplace books were generally private collections of information, but as the amount of information grew following the invention of movable type and printing became less expensive, some were published for the general public. Commonplaces are a separate genre of writing from diaries or travelogues.

In 1685 the English Enlightenment philosopher John Locke wrote a treatise in French on commonplace books, translated into English in 1706 as A New Method of Making Common-Place-Books, "in which techniques for entering proverbs, quotations, ideas, speeches were formulated. Locke gave specific advice on how to arrange material by subject and category, using such key topics as love, politics, or religion. Following the publication of his work, publishers often printed empty commonplace books with space for headings and indices to be filled in by their users. An example is "Bell’s Common-Place Book, Formed generally upon the Principles Recommended and Practised by Mr Locke" which was published by John Bell almost a century after Locke's treatise. A copy of this blank commonplace was used by Erasmus Darwin from 1776 to 1787, and it was later used by Charles Darwin who called it "the great book" when composing his grandfather's biography.

By the early eighteenth century, they had become an information management device in which a note-taker stored quotations, observations, and definitions. They were used in private households to collate ethical or informative texts, sometimes alongside recipes or medical formulae. For women, who were excluded from formal higher education, the commonplace book could be a repository of intellectual references. The gentlewoman Elizabeth Lyttelton kept one from the 1670s to 1713 and a typical example was published by Mrs Anna Jameson in 1855, including headings such as Ethical Fragments; Theological; Literature and Art. Commonplace books were used by scientists and other thinkers in the same way that a database might now be used: Carl Linnaeus, for instance, used commonplacing techniques to invent and arrange the nomenclature of his Systema Naturae (which is the basis for the system used by scientists today).

As a result of the development of information technology, there exist various software applications that perform the functions that paper-based commonplace books served for previous generations of thinkers.

History

Philosophical origins 
Beginning in Topica, Aristotle distinguished between forms of argumentation and referred to them as commonplaces. He extended the idea in Rhetoric where he suggested that they also be used to explore the validity of propositions through rhetoric. Cicero in his own Topica and De Oratore further clarified the idea of commonplaces and applied them to public speaking. He also created a list of commonplaces which included sententiae or wise sayings or quotations by philosophers, statesmen, and poets. Quintilian further expanded these ideas in Institutio Oratoria, a treatise on rhetoric education, and asked his readers to commit their commonplaces to memory. He also framed these commonplaces in moral and ethical overtones.

While there are ancient compilations by writers including Pliny and Diogenes Laertius many authors in the Renaissance credited Aulus Gellius as the founder of the genre with his commonplace Attic Nights.

In the first century AD, Seneca the Younger suggested that readers collect commonplace ideas and sententiae as if like a bee and by imitation turn them into their own honey-like words. By late antiquity, the idea of employing commonplaces in rhetorical settings was well established.

Presumed to have been written in the fifth century Stobaeus compiled an extensive two volume manuscript commonly known as The Anthologies of excerpts containing 1,430 poetry and prose quotations of works of which only 315 are still extant in the 21st century.

In the sixth century Boethius had translated both Aristotle and Cicero's work and created his own account of commonplaces in De topicis differentiis.

Florilegium 

By the eighth century, the idea of commonplaces was used, primarily in religious contexts, by preachers and theologians, to collect excerpted passages from the Bible or from approved Church Fathers. Early in this time period passages were collected and arranged in the order of their appearance in the works from which they were taken, but by the thirteenth century they were more commonly arranged under thematic headings. These religious anthologies were referred to as florilegia which translates as gatherings of flowers. Often these collections were used by their creators to compose sermons.

Early examples 
Precursors to the commonplace book were the records kept by Roman and Greek philosophers of their thoughts and daily meditations, often including quotations from other thinkers. The practice of keeping a journal such as this was particularly recommended by Stoics such as Seneca and Marcus Aurelius, whose own work Meditations (2nd century AD) was originally a private record of thoughts and quotations. The Pillow Book of Sei Shonagon, a courtier of the tenth or eleventh-century Japan is likewise a private book of anecdote and poetry, daily thoughts and lists. However, none of these includes the wider range of sources usually associated with commonplace books. A number of renaissance scholars kept something resembling a commonplace book – for example Leonardo da Vinci, who described his notebook exactly as a commonplace book is structured: "A collection without order, drawn from many papers, which I have copied here, hoping to arrange them later each in its place, according to the subjects of which they treat."

Zibaldone

During the course of the fifteenth century, the Italian peninsula was the site of the development of two new forms of book production: the deluxe registry book and the zibaldone (or hodgepodge book). What differentiated these two forms was their language of composition: a vernacular. Giovanni Rucellai, the compiler of one of the most sophisticated examples of the genre, defined it as a "salad of many herbs".

Zibaldone were always paper codices of small or medium format – never the large desk copies of registry books or other display texts. They also lacked the lining and extensive ornamentation of other deluxe copies. Rather than miniatures, a zibaldone often incorporates the author's sketches. Zibaldone were in cursive scripts (first chancery minuscule and later mercantile minuscule) and contained what palaeographer Armando Petrucci describes as "an astonishing variety of poetic and prose texts". Devotional, technical, documentary, and literary texts appear side by side in no discernible order. The juxtaposition of taxes paid, currency exchange rates, medicinal remedies, recipes and favourite quotations from Augustine and Virgil portrays a developing secular, literate culture. By far the most popular literary selections were the works of Dante Alighieri, Francesco Petrarca and Giovanni Boccaccio: the "Three Crowns" of the Florentine vernacular traditions. These collections have been used by modern scholars as a source for interpreting how merchants and artisans interacted with the literature and visual arts of the Florentine Renaissance.

The best-known zibaldone is Giacomo Leopardi's nineteenth-century Zibaldone di pensieri, however, it significantly departs from the early modern genre of commonplace books and is rather comparable to the intellectual diary which was practiced, for example, by Lichtenberg, Joubert, Coleridge, Valery, among others.

English
By the seventeenth century, commonplacing had become a recognized practice that was formally taught to college students in such institutions as Oxford. John Locke appended his indexing scheme for commonplace books to a printing of his An Essay Concerning Human Understanding.  The commonplace tradition in which Francis Bacon and John Milton were educated had its roots in the pedagogy of classical rhetoric, and "commonplacing" persisted as a popular study technique until the early twentieth century. Commonplace books were used by many key thinkers of the Enlightenment, with authors like the philosopher and theologian William Paley using them to write books.  Both Ralph Waldo Emerson and Henry David Thoreau were taught to keep commonplace books at Harvard University (their commonplace books survive in published form).

However, it was also a domestic and private practice that was particularly attractive to authors. Some, such as Samuel Taylor Coleridge, Mark Twain and Virginia Woolf kept messy reading notes that were intermixed with other quite various material; others, such as Thomas Hardy, followed a more formal reading-notes method that mirrored the original Renaissance practice more closely.  The older, "clearinghouse" function of the commonplace book, to condense and centralize useful and even "model" ideas and expressions, became less popular over time.

Examples

Manuscripts 
Adelaide Horatio Seymour Spencer, 19th century gentlewoman. Held in the Franklin Library, University of Pennsylvania.
Glastonbury Miscellany. (Trinity College, Cambridge, MS 0.9.38). Originally designed as an account book.
Isaac Newton (1643–1727), mathematician and physicist. Held at the University of Cambridge, with a digitised version freely available to view online. He developed the calculus in a commonplace which he called his waste book.
Jean Miélot, 15th-century Burgundian translator and author. His book is in the Bibliothèque nationale de France, and the main sources for his verses, many written for court occasions.
 Loci communes (Pseudo-Maximus), a late 9th or early 10th century florilegium
Richard Hill, a London grocer (Oxford, Balliol College, MS 354).
Robert Reynes of Acle, Norfolk (Oxford, Bodleian Library, MS Tanner 407).
Virginia Woolf, 20th-century novelist. Some of her notebooks are held in Smith College, Massachusetts.
Zibaldone da Canal merchant's commonplace book (New Haven, CT, Beinecke Rare Book & Manuscript Library, MS 327)

Published examples 
 Transcribed by Bruce Sterling.
 Ben Jonson, Timber; or, Discoveries, made upon men and matter, as they have flow’d out of his daily Readings, or had their reflux to his peculiar Notion of the Times (London, 1641).
E.M. Forster, Commonplace Book, ed. Philip Gardner (Stanford: Stanford University Press, 1985).
Francis Bacon, The Promus of Formularies and Elegancies, Longman, Greens and Company, London, 1883. Bacon's Promus was a rough list of elegant and useful phrases gleaned from reading and conversation that Bacon used as a sourcebook in writing and probably also as a promptbook for oral practice in public speaking.
 John Man, Commonplaces of Christian Religion (London, 1578)
 John Marbeck, A book of notes and commonplaces…collected and gathered out of the works of diverse singular writers and brought alphabetically into order (London, 1581).
John Milton, Milton's Commonplace Book, in John Milton:  Complete Prose Works, gen. ed. Don M. Wolfe (New Haven: Yale University Press, 1953).  Milton kept scholarly notes from his reading, complete with page citations to use in writing his tracts and poems.
Mrs. Anna Anderson, A Common Place Book of Thoughts, Memories and Fancies (Longman, Brown, Green and Longman, 1855)
 Philip Melanchthon, Loci communes, 1512 (Internet Archive)
Robert Burns, Robert Burns's Commonplace Book. 1783–1785. James Cameron Ewing and Davidson Cook. Glasgow : Gowans and Gray Ltd., 1938.
 Ronald Reagan (1911–2004) kept a commonplace book with traditional commonplace headings and using index cards which "were kept in the plastic sleeves of a black photo album". They are held at the Ronald Reagan Presidential Library. Edited by his biographer Douglas Brinkley, his notes were published as the book The Notes: Ronald Reagan's Private Collection of Stories and Wisdom (Harper Collins, 2011).
The Commonplace Book of Elizabeth Lyttelton (Cambridge University Press, 1919)
 W. Ross Ashby (1903–1972) started a commonplace book in a journal in May 1928 as a medical student. He kept it for 44 years until his death at which point it occupied 25 volumes comprising 7,189 pages and was indexed with 1,600 index cards. The British Library created a digital archive of his commonplace which has been published online with extensive cross-linking based on his original index. http://www.rossashby.info/index.html
W.H. Auden, A Certain World (New York: The Viking Press, 1970).
The Houghton Club, which holds the fishing rights to more than a dozen miles of the river Test, kept a club commonplace book from 1827 - 1902, filled with manuscript text and drawings, with numerous letters and drawings by members tipped in. A limited edition facsimile was printed for members (London: Atelier Press, 2019).

Literary references to commonplacing
 Amos Bronson Alcott, 1877:  "The habit of journalizing becomes a life-long lesson in the art of composition, an informal schooling for authorship. And were the process of preparing their works for publication faithfully detailed by distinguished writers, it would appear how large were their indebtedness to their diary and commonplaces. How carefully should we peruse Shakespeare's notes used in compiling his plays—what was his, what another's—showing how these were fashioned into the shapely whole we read, how Milton composed, Montaigne, Goethe: by what happy strokes of thought, flashes of wit, apt figures, fit quotations snatched from vast fields of learning, their rich pages were wrought forth! This were to give the keys of great authorship!"  Amos Bronson Alcott, Table-Talk of A. Bronson Alcott (Boston: Roberts Brothers, 1877), p. 12.
 In Arthur Conan Doyle's Sherlock Holmes stories, Holmes keeps numerous commonplace books, which he sometimes uses when doing research.  For example, in "The Adventure of the Veiled Lodger", he researches the newspaper reports of an old murder in a commonplace book.
 In Alan Moore's graphic novel Providence, the protagonist Robert Black keeps a commonplace book; his entries into this book make up the second halves of the novel's chapters, contrasting with the graphic sections.
 In Lemony Snicket's A Series of Unfortunate Events a number of characters including Klaus Baudelaire and the Quagmire triplets keep commonplace books.
 In Michael Ondaatje's The English Patient, Count Almásy uses his copy of Herodotus's Histories as a commonplace book.
 Virginia Woolf, mid-20th century: "[L]et us take down one of those old notebooks which we have all, at one time or another, had a passion for beginning. Most of the pages are blank, it is true; but at the beginning we shall find a certain number very beautifully covered with a strikingly legible hand-writing. Here we have written down the names of great writers in their order of merit; here we have copied out fine passages from the classics; here are lists of books to be read; and here, most interesting of all, lists of books that have actually been read, as the reader testifies with some youthful vanity by a dash of red ink."  Virginia Woolf, "Hours in a Library", Granite and Rainbow: Essays by Virginia Woolf  (New York: Harcourt, Brace and Co., 1958), p. 25.

See also

 Attic Nights
 Biji (Chinese literature), a similar Chinese genre
 Book of Shadows
 Bullet journal
 Card file
 Commentarii
 Family cookbooks
 Hypomnema
 Knowledge organization
 Memex
 Memoranda books
 Miscellany
 Notebook (style)
 Notetaking
 Comparison of notetaking software
 Personal information management
 List of personal information managers
 Personal knowledge base
 Personal knowledge management
 Personal wiki
 
 Reference management software
 Sammelband
 Silva rerum (aka sylvae ("forests"))
 
 Swipe file
 Table-book
 
 Thesaurus ("treasure chests")
 Vade mecum ("go with me") or handbook

Notes

Further reading 
 Burke, Victoria E. Recent Studies in Commonplace Books. English Literary Renaissance. The University of Chicago Press. 43 (1 (Winter 2013)): 153–177. doi:10.2307/43607607. Retrieved 3 August 2021.
 A thorough bibliography of research and writing on commonplace books with associated notes.
 Havens, Earle (2001). Commonplace Books: A History of Manuscripts and Printed Books from Antiquity to the Twentieth Century. Yale University.

Handbooks 
Influential treatises, handbooks, and books in the history of the commonplace tradition. 
 Desiderius Erasmus, . Cologne, 1540.
 Desiderius Erasmus, De ratione studii et instituendi pueros comentarii totidem. [Paris, 1512].
 Henry Peacham, The garden of eloquence: conteyning the figures of grammar and rhetorick. London, 1577. 
 One of the first handbooks in English
 Joachim Camerarius, Elementa rhetoricae. Basel, [1545].
 John Brinsley, . London, 1612.
 John Locke, . London, 1706.
 Introduced a popular method for creating an index for commonplaces.
 Obadiah Walker, . Oxford, 1673.
 Petrus Mosellanus, Tabulae de schematibus et tropis.... In Rhetroica Philippi Melanchthonis. In Erasmi Roterdami libellum De duplici copia. Paris, 1542.
 Philip Melanchthon, De locis communibus ratio. Augsburg [1593].
 Philip Melanchthon, Institutiones rhetoricae. Wittenberg [1536].
 Philip Melanchthon, Rhetorices elementa. Lyon, 1537.
 Rodolphus Agricola, De formando studio. Antwerp, 1532; composed 1484.

External links

 
Cameron Louis, ed. (1980). The Commonplace Book of Robert Reynes of Acle
Commonplace Books by Prof. Lucia Knoles, Assumption College.
Commonplace Books, Harvard Open Collections – digitized commonplace books
Commonplaces as figures of speech
Extraordinary Commonplaces, New York Review of Books

Medieval literature
Books by type
Publishing
Books of quotations
Note-taking